"Let's Go, Let's Go, Let's Go" (also known as "There's a Thrill on The Hill") is a 1960 pop and R&B single written by Hank Ballard and performed by Hank Ballard and The Midnighters.

Chart performance
The single was the last of the Midnighters' three #1 singles on the R&B chart, staying there for three non-consecutive weeks. "Let's Go, Let's Go, Let's Go" is also Ballard & the Midnighters' most successful pop single, peaking at #6.

See also
List of number-one R&B singles of 1960 (U.S.)

References

1960 singles
Hank Ballard & the Midnighters songs
Songs written by Hank Ballard
1960 songs
King Records (United States) singles